The 2017–18 season was Port Vale's 106th season of football in the English Football League, and first season back in EFL League Two following relegation from EFL League One. The season covers the period from 1 July 2017 through to 30 June 2018.

The season began as Michael Brown's first full season as manager, and he targeted promotion as he built a new squad in the summer. The rebuilding process required a massive clear out of 21 players, and in their place he signed 13 permanent players and seven loan players, including former two-time Player of the Year Tom Pope. After winning on the opening day, Vale then went a club record six successive game in all competitions without scoring a goal, losing straight league games to go bottom of the league in September. This run was ended with a 1–1 draw at home to Forest Green Rovers on 16 September, which proved to be Brown's last match in charge. His replacement was former defender Neil Aspin, who was joined by former manager John Rudge in a director of football role. They oversaw an upturn in results, though the club exited the FA Cup following a replay in the Second Round; Aspin bemoaned refereeing decisions that saw Vale reduced to nine men, though they managed to take Yeovil Town into extra-time despite twice going behind with two fewer players.

Aspin signed three players and four loanees in the January transfer window, the most significant addition being that of Luke Hannant; meanwhile three players and four loanees left the club, the biggest loss being Gavin Gunning, who went to relegation rivals Forest Green Rovers. Vale went 14 games without a win at the start of 2018, but victory over Chesterfield on Good Friday eased genuine concerns of relegation into the National League. Nevertheless, a run of just two wins in their 21 games in 2018 meant that they finished in 20th-place, the joint-lowest finish in the club's history. They remained largely reliant on Player of the Year Tom Pope's 19 goals to stay in the league.

Overview

EFL League Two
Despite being unable to prevent relegation as caretaker-manager the previous season, Michael Brown was confirmed as the club's new permanent manager in May 2017; incumbent assistants David "Ned" Kelly and Chris Morgan also retained their positions, as did chief scout Darren Wrack. Brown said that the budget available left him with "a good chance of gaining promotion". His first summer signing was former two-time Player of the Year Tom Pope on a free transfer after he managed to secure his release from Bury. He made his second signing four weeks later, goalkeeper Rob Lainton, who also arrived on a free transfer from Bury. Also arriving were Colombian winger Cristian Montaño, released from Bristol Rovers, and former Vale youth centre-back Joe Davis, on a free transfer from Fleetwood Town, and 22-year old Burton Albion goalkeeper Sam Hornby. These signings were quickly followed by the arrival of 19-year old Sheffield United left-back Graham Kelly. A third Bury player also arrived in the form of 34-year old centre-back Antony Kay, a veteran of over 600 professional matches. However Brown also revealed that defender Kjell Knops had picked up an infection in his knee and would miss the entire season after undergoing surgery.

Heading into July, Brown brought in target man striker Tyrone Barnett on a free transfer from AFC Wimbledon. He took on a wide variety of players on trial, including: Danny Green, Neal Eardley, Michael Tonge, Gavin Gunning, Billy Whitehouse, Tom Walker, Gaetan Lenoir, and Nicolas Guidicelli. He signed 19-year old Huddersfield Town striker Rekeil Pyke on a season-long loan. As last season's captain Ben Purkiss rejected a new contract offer, Brown signed right-back Lawrie Wilson on a free transfer from Bolton Wanderers to replace him. Having decided against signing one of the wingers on trial, Brown instead brought in Burton Albion's Marcus Harness on a season-long loan. On the same day that Barnett was revealed to have suffered a serious hamstring tear, the club announced that trialist centre-back Gavin Gunning had signed a contract of undisclosed-length. The day before the opening game of the season, Brown secured veteran trialist midfielder Michael Tonge to a one-year deal, and also brought in 21-year old winger Ben Whitfield on a half-season loan from A.F.C. Bournemouth.

Brown played eight débutantes at Crawley Town on 5 August, and it was two of these, Kay and Tonge, who scored the opening goals of a 3–1 victory, finished off with a first league goal for Dan Turner. Two days later Brown signed 21-year old left-back Tyler Denton on a season-long loan from Leeds United. Adebayo Akinfenwa put Wycombe Wanderers ahead within two minutes of the opening home game of the season at Vale Park on 12 August, and by the 25-minute mark he had scored the opposition's final goal of a 3–2 defeat for the "Valiants". In the week following the defeat to Wycombe, both Anton Forrester and Danny Pugh were ruled out of action for three to four months, and Brown signed 20-year old Sheffield Wednesday winger Jack Stobbs on a season-long loan. The match at Chesterfield was declared "Ernie Moss Day" in tribute to the legend of both clubs, but another poor performance saw Vale slip to a 2–0 defeat to a side that had previously failed to pick up a point. Fans booed the team and turned on the manager, chanting 'You don't know what you're doing'. In the week building up to the local derby with Crewe Alexandra, Brown signed highly rated midfielder David Worrall. Worrall made his debut against Crewe, but it was midfield partner Michael Tonge who made the headlines for the wrong reasons, as he was sent off four minutes after Crewe's Chris Dagnall scored the only goal of the game on the half-hour mark; Brown said that Tonge was unlucky to be sent off and he was proud of his team's performance. On the final day before the summer transfer window closed, Brown signed Burnley centre-back Tom Anderson on a season-long loan and Doncaster Rovers central midfielder Harry Middleton on a free transfer.

Vale fell to 23rd-place at the beginning of September with a 1–0 home defeat to Notts County; Brown said his team were "sucker punched, against the run of play". Seven days later Tyrone Barnett returned from injury to make his Vale debut at Coventry City, however goalkeeper Lainton picked up an injury as Vale fell to rock bottom of the Football League with a 1–0 defeat despite playing against ten-men for the closing stages of the game; the injury-list now included Lainton, Pugh, Montaño, Forrester, Pyke, Knops, with Tonge suspended. A sixth consecutive league loss followed in a 2–0 defeat at Luton Town, which was also the sixth successive game in all competitions in which Vale had failed to score a goal – a club record. Chief Executive Colin Garlick said the club had not set any ultimatum to Brown for the home game with second-from-bottom Forest Green Rovers on 16 September. Brown signed Derby County goalkeeper Kelle Roos on an emergency loan and played him against Forest Green. Turner broke Vale's barren spell against Forest Green, scoring his third of the campaign in a rare start, but Rovers made three early substitutions and came back into the game to force a 1–1 draw which kept Vale bottom of the table; despite this Brown was confident he would still be in charge of the club for the following match. His confidence was misplaced however, as he was sacked shortly after the match; his assistants, David "Ned" Kelly and Chris Morgan were placed in charge of the club on an interim basis. They first took charge for the trip to Yeovil Town on 23 September, and were on the way to a 1–0 win when an error from Roos gifted Yeovil an equaliser; Vale ended up holding on to a 1–1 draw after James Gibbons marked his league debut with a sending off for two yellow cards. Three days later they took the lead at home to high-flying Accrington Stanley, but fell to a 2–1 defeat after a Billy Kee brace either side of half-time. The run of poor form continued with a 2–0 defeat at Stevenage. Meanwhile, the search for a new manager dragged on, as Smurthwaite ruled out National League managers John Askey and Neil Aspin, stating that the list of prospective names had been narrowed down to three 'exceptional' candidates.

Despite previously being ruled out by Smurthwaite, Gateshead manager Neil Aspin was installed as Port Vale manager on 4 October, advised by former manager John Rudge in a director of football role. Three days later his new team got off to an excellent start at home to Grimsby Town as they were leading 1–0 at half-time with a Tom Pope goal, but then a second-half turnaround saw them lose the match 2–1 and slip back into the relegation zone. Aspin managed a victory in his second game though, with Pope scoring a brace in a 3–1 home win over Cheltenham Town. Aspin went on to name Danny Pugh as the club's new captain, ahead of the dropped Antony Kay. Vale then recorded a 3–0 win at Morecambe, with Pope again scoring a brace and Montaño marking his return to action with his first goal for the club. Pope again scored at third-placed Exeter City to give Vale a 1–0 victory in blustery conditions. Following an injury to Roos, Aspin acted swiftly to sign the big Bulgarian goalkeeper Dimitar Evtimov on loan from Nottingham Forest, who started immediately in the 3–0 home defeat to Swindon Town. Aspin said he was "very disappointed about the whole goalkeeping situation". Aspin went on to be nominated for the EFL League Two Manager of the Month award and Pope was nominated for the EFL League Two Player of the Month award, after three wins in five games and five goals and one assist for Pope.

Going into November, Aspin signed 20-year box-to-box midfielder Chris Regis, who had previously entered non-league football after spending time on the books at Arsenal, Southampton and Colchester United. Vale then travelled to Newport County, and returned home with a point after coming back from 1–0 down, Anton Forrester scoring with his first league appearance of the campaign. Fellow relegation battlers Barnet arrived in Burslem on 18 November, and Vale claimed a hard-fought victory after Pope converted a late penalty won by Gibbons. This was Port Vale's first penalty since 20 January. However three days later the Vale fell to a 4–0 defeat at home to Mansfield Town, though Aspin said his team worked hard and the scoreline was not a fair reflection on the game. They then suffered a 3–1 defeat away to Lincoln City, having looked second best to the National League champions for most of the match; Aspin said the performance was not good enough. Also in November, long-serving full-back Adam Yates returned from a loan spell at Macclesfield Town only to suffer extensive facial injuries in a collision with Hornby in a reserve team match; despite his injury and in light of his service to the club, Yates was given a contract extension to keep him on until the end of the season. However he went on to announce his retirement from playing in March.

Aspin paid tribute to supporters who helped clear snow off the pitch prior to an important 2–0 home win over Cambridge United on 9 December; Montaño scored both of the goals either side of half-time, helping to put an end to the team's recent run of bad results. They continued their good form under Aspin with a 2–1 victory at Carlisle United, as he changed tactics with the scores at 0–0 after sensing the hosts were there to be beaten. The following week the club and Aspin came to an agreement on a new two-and-a-half year contract. The team celebrated by securing a useful point at play-off hopefuls Colchester United, coming from a goal down at half-time to draw the game 1–1. Nathan Smith then scored the only goal of the Boxing day game with play-off chasing Coventry City. They ended the year in style with a 4–0 home victory over league leaders Luton, which left them ten points clear of the relegation zone and nine points off the play-offs; "Hatters" boss Nathan Jones said that "they were better than us all over the park. They got second balls, they outworked us, we didn’t handle Pope all afternoon and we got what we deserved." Aspin was nominated for that month's EFL League Two Manager of the Month award, though lost out to Danny Cowley at Lincoln City.

Vale opened the New Year with a 1–0 defeat at second-placed Notts County, and though Aspin was pleased with his players he was highly critical of the referee for his award of a late penalty, calling it "a really bad decision". Earlier in the day he made his second signing as manager, bringing in striker Dior Angus from non-league Redditch United. Meanwhile, Gavin Gunning left the club on the expiry of his contract, whilst Jack Stobbs, Rekeil Pyke and Tyler Denton returned to their parent clubs. In contrast, Whitfield's loan was extended until the end of the season. Gunning made his debut for Forest Green on 6 January, and kept a clean sheet as Rovers beat the Vale 1–0 with a goal from fellow débutante Reuben Reid; Aspin apologized to supporters after the match for the team's performance. Aspin went on to allow Lawrie Wilson to join National League side Ebbsfleet United after the full-back failed to make the first-team under his tenure. He also agreed to terminate the contract of French midfielder Anthony de Freitas, whilst bringing in striker Donovan Wilson on loan from Wolverhampton Wanderers. Vale put in a poor performance at home to Yeovil, though did claim a 1–1 draw after Pope converted a late penalty. Aspin went on to sign midfielder Luke Hannant from Gateshead for an undisclosed fee, having previously signed the 24-year old from Team Northumbria in 2016. He also boosted the defensive numbers by bringing in centre-back Zak Jules on loan from Shrewsbury Town. Hannant made his debut at Accrington Stanley on 20 January, a game in which Vale led 2–0 at half-time only to lose 3–2; Aspin went on to criticise both the referee for failing to spot a handball for Accrington's equaliser and also his team for poor defending. Jules made his debut and Lainton returned to the starting eleven for the visit of Colchester on 27 January, and Vale managed to secure a 2–2 draw despite a poor performance thanks to a brace from Worrall. A surprise departure was then announced, as Anderson was recalled early from his loan spell by Burnley. Aspin responded quickly by signing former youth-team centre-back Charlie Raglan on loan from Oxford United, 21-year old defender Kyle Howkins on loan from West Bromwich Albion and 23-year old defender Callum Howe for an undisclosed fee from Lincoln City.

Raglan started at home to struggling Morecambe on 3 February, and helped the defence to keep a clean sheet in a dour 0–0 draw. However they then conceded five at Cheltenham Town, including a hat-trick from Mohamed Eisa, after long spells of defensive errors. Tonge opened the scoring at Swindon on 17 February, but defensive and goalkeeping errors from the returning Ryan Boot ended up costing the team a 3–2 defeat, with former player Marc Richards scoring a brace. Vale then kept a clean sheet at home to Newport County, but played poorly and only picked up a point whilst relegation rivals Chesterfield, Barnet, Forest Green, Crewe Alex and Morecambe all gained three points.

Without a win since 2017, Vale then lost top-scorer Tom Pope for the month of March after he was forced to undergo an operation to repair a hernia. Grimsby Town were in even worse form however, and on 10 March Vale seemed to be on their way to a vital 1–0 away win despite missing a penalty; however a stoppage-time equaliser from James Berrett extended Vale's winless streak and instigated a crowd invasion and punch-up from amongst the away end. They then faced a hastily rearranged trip to bottom club Barnet three days later, and salvaged a 1–1 draw after Forrester capitalised on a goalkeeping error. Vale went on to come from two goals down at Stevenage to salvage a point, Wilson and Hannant scoring their first goals for the club, to maintain a healthy seven point gap with the relegation zone with only nine games left to play. Despite a decent performance, they failed to extend this gap after losing 1–0 at home to promotion-chasing Exeter. Vale went on to gain a useful point with a hard-working performance during a 0–0 draw at third-place Wycombe; Boot's performance in goal earned him a place on the EFL Team of the Week. They hosted 23rd-placed Chesterfield in a crucial game on Good Friday, and Pugh went from hero to villain on the cusp of half-time as he scored the opening goal and then got sent off for a studs up challenge two minutes later to leave his teammates to defend their 1–0 lead with ten men over the course of the second half; Vale did concede an equaliser, before substitute Whitfield won the game late on with an excellent strike.

Vale took the short trip to Crewe on 2 April and started poorly after an error from Boot gifted Ryan Wintle the opening goal on seven minutes, but they equalised before half-time with a penalty against the run of play; Kay seemed to have scored the winning goal from long-range on 71 minutes, but a stoppage-time equaliser from Charlie Kirk denied Vale the three points. Five days later Vale lost 2–1 at home to Crawley after Smith gave away a penalty and scored an own goal, though the penalty decision of referee Mike Jones was highly contentious; Aspin called the referee's performance 'diabolical'. Newly crowned EFL Trophy champions Lincoln visited Vale Park on 14 April, and Vale all but secured their safety on that day after Kay scored the winner on 63 minutes. Vale set up defensively at Mansfield and managed to rescue a point after a late equalising goal from Pope cancelled out a clumsy own goal; after match Aspin summarised the season by saying that "I think they have done well, from the position they were in, to getting to safety." Angus scored on his home debut on 28 April, but this was not enough to prevent the final match of the season at Vale Park being a 2–1 defeat to Carlisle United, much to Aspin's disappointment.

Vale ended their league campaign with a 5–0 defeat at Cambridge United, leaving them in 20th-place – the joint-lowest finish in the club's history (the other being the 1979–80 season). At the end of the season Aspin released ten players – Chris Regis, Ryan Boot, Luke Dennis, Anton Forrester, Graham Kelly, Kjell Knops, Harry Middleton, Billy Reeves, Joe Slinn and Charlie Walford – and transfer-listed Tyrone Barnett, Joe Davis, Callum Howe and Rob Lainton, as he attempted to build his own squad for the 2018–19 season.

Finances & ownership issues
Norman Smurthwaite resigned as chairman at the end of the 2016–17 season, and 67-year-old former British Rail manager and lifelong Vale supporter Tony Fradley was unveiled as his successor, though Smurthwaite remained as owner. Following relegation, season ticket prices were cut by £50 to £295 with under-12s allowed in for free. The new shirt sponsors were the manorshop.com, owned by Kidsgrove businessman Kevin Jones, who had made a failed attempt to buy the club in May 2017. Speaking in August, Smurthwaite said that the wage budget was 20% higher than the previous season due to the extra money raised from the sales of Jak Alnwick and Anthony Grant in January 2017. The club took out £50,000 in 'promotion insurance', which would cover the cost in bonuses should the club achieve promotion at the end of the season. On 31 January 2018, the sale of Jordan Hugill from Preston North End to West Ham United gained Vale around £1.8 million thanks to a 20% sell on clause negotiated by Micky Adams following his departure from Vale Park in 2014.

Smurthwaite attended the Port Vale Supporters' Club meeting in March, and stated that the club was losing around £150,000 a month, that the playing budget was £1.6 million (he believed this to be a top ten League Two budget), that he would only sell to the right buyer and would not be publicly naming his asking price, that when he took over the club the Football League appointed Karl Oyston as his mentor, and he challenged the fans to raise £800,000 among themselves (£270 each for the club's 3,000 hardcore supporters) in order to fund the club throughout the summer in a "positive way of demonstrating to me that you don’t want me".

Cup competitions
Vale had a difficult tie at home to EFL League One side Oxford United in the first round of the FA Cup, but proved to be the superior side on the night as they progressed with a 2−0 win thanks to goals from Gunning and Pope. A home tie with Yeovil Town awaited in the second round, and for the first time since 20 January 1982 Staffordshire Police granted the club permission to play a home tie at the same date and time as Stoke City. Despite a poor first half Vale seemed to have the game won thanks to a Tom Pope header, but the team switched off defensively to allow substitute Jordan Green to score a last-minute equaliser and take the game to a replay. The game at Huish Park proved eventful, as red cards for Montaño and Gibbons did not prevent the Vale from twice equalising the match before eventually losing 3–2 after extra-time; Harness had scored his first goal for the club to take the game into extra-time in style with a long-range shot, but his effort was upstaged by Kay, who scored the "goal of his life" with a stunning long-range lob. Aspin was highly critical of referee Gavin Ward, particularly for his decision to both issue a penalty and send off Montaño for a "soft" challenge.

Vale were drawn away to EFL Championship club Leeds United in the first round of the EFL Cup. Before the match Brown spoke of his pride at managing against former club Leeds, and he named another former Leeds player, Danny Pugh, as captain for the night. However the match ended on a sour note as Brown accused hat-trick hero Samuel Sáiz of spitting at Davis just before half-time, and Gunning was sent off as Vale fell to a 4–1 defeat.

Vale were drawn into EFL Trophy Northern Group D, alongside Oldham Athletic, Newcastle United Academy, and local rivals Crewe Alexandra. They began the group with their solitary away game, playing out a 0–0 draw with League One side Oldham at Boundary Park, before they managed to pick up two points after winning the resulting penalty shoot-out. Vale then recorded a 1–0 victory over the Newcastle United Academy in front of a first-team record low crowd at Vale Park of 824. The game against already eliminated Crewe was largely inconsequential, but proved to be an entertaining one as Regis marked his debut with a goal in a 4–2 win. League One high-flyers Shrewsbury Town came to Burslem in the Second Round, and Vale sensed an upset after Montaño scored in the first minute, but former Valiant Louis Dodds initiated a second half comeback to eliminate Vale from the competition.

Results

Pre-season

EFL League Two

League table

Results by matchday

Matches

FA Cup

EFL Cup

EFL Trophy

Squad statistics

Appearances and goals

Top scorers

Disciplinary record

Awards

Transfers

Transfers in

Transfers out

Loans in

Loans out

References

Port Vale F.C. seasons
Port Vale